Suchard is a surname. Notable people with the surname include:

 Marc A. Suchard (born 1972), American statistician
 Rabbi Mordechai Suchard, founder of Gateways
 Philippe Suchard, Swiss chocolatier and founder of Chocolat Suchard

Jewish surnames